Samuel Adesina (1958–9 – February 24, 2014) was a Nigerian politician and former Speaker of the Ondo State House of Assembly.

Political career
In April 2011, he contested the seat of his constituency, Odigbo Constituency II
and won on the platform of the Labour Party.
On May 29, 2011, he was elected  Speaker of the assembly.
He served in this capacity for 3 years until he died on February 24, 2014, at the age of 56 from bladder cancer.

References

1950s births
2014 deaths
People from Ondo State
Deaths from cancer in Nigeria
Nigerian politicians
Deaths from bladder cancer